The Tree of Life is a 2011 American experimental coming-of-age drama film written and directed by Terrence Malick. Its main cast includes  Brad Pitt, Sean Penn, Hunter McCracken, Laramie Eppler, Jessica Chastain, and Tye Sheridan in his debut feature film role. The film chronicles the origins and meaning of life by way of a man's early life memories of his family living in 1950s Texas, interspersed with imagery of the origins of the known universe and the inception of life on Earth.

After several years in development and missing its planned 2009 and 2010 release dates, The Tree of Life premiered in competition at the 2011 Cannes Film Festival, where it was awarded the Palme d'Or. It ranked number one on review aggregator Metacritic's "Film Critic Top Ten List of 2011", and made more critics' year-end lists for 2011 than any other film. It has since been ranked by some publications as one of the greatest films of the 2010s, of the 21st century, or of all time. The Tree of Life received three Oscar nominations: Best Picture, Best Director and Best Cinematography.

Plot
The film begins with a quotation from the Book of Job 38:4-7: "Where were you when I laid the foundations of the Earth?... When the morning stars sang together, and all the sons of God shouted for joy?" Then a mysterious, flame-like light flickers in the darkness.

Around the 1960s, Mrs. and Mr. O'Brien are informed of the death of their 19-year-old son, R.L., throwing the family into turmoil. In 2010, eldest son Jack is adrift in his modern life as a Texan architect, disillusioned by his life full of disappointments. Amid all this, voiceovers from Mrs. O'Brien ask God why R.L. had to die. Then, visuals depict the birth of the universe, followed by the creation of Earth and the beginning of life. At one point, a dinosaur chooses not to kill another dinosaur that is injured and lying on the side of a river bed. Finally, an asteroid strikes the Earth.

In a suburban neighborhood in Waco, Texas around the 1940s, the O'Briens are enthralled by their new baby Jack and, later his two brothers, R.L. and Stevie. In the 1950s, Jack is conflicted with accepting the way of grace or nature, as embodied by his parents. Mrs. O'Brien, the embodiment of grace, presents the world to her sons as a place of wonder. Mr. O'Brien, the embodiment of nature, easily loses his temper as he struggles to reconcile his love for his sons, wanting to prepare them for a world he sees as corrupt and exploitative. He laments his decision to work in a power plant instead of pursuing his passion for music, and tries to get ahead by filing patents for various inventions.

Jack's perceptions of the world begin to change after one of his friends, Taylor, drowns. He questions how God could allow such things to happen, and that if God is malicious, he can be too. He becomes angry at his father's continuous hypocrisies and misdeeds, lashing out at his mother for tolerating him. When Mr. O'Brien goes on a business trip, the boys enjoy unfettered access to their mother, and Jack experiences the first twinges of rebelliousness. Peer-pressured, Jack commits vandalism and animal abuse. When trespassing into his crush's house, he steals her sheer nightgown; he then fearfully throws it into a river. Shortly after Mr. O'Brien returns, the plant that he works at closes; he is given the option of relocating to work in an inferior position within the firm or losing his job. As the family packs up to move to the new job, he laments his path of life, asking Jack to forgive his domineering behavior; Jack reflectively says he embodies nature.

As Jack leaves work, he rides the elevator up, envisioning following a young girl across rocky terrain. As he walks through a wooden door frame erected on the rocks, he sees a view of the far distant future in which the Sun expands into a red giant, engulfing Earth and then shrinking into a white dwarf. After emerging from rustic doors, Jack follows the girl, then a young version of himself, across surreal landscapes. The dead return to life and gather at the seaside, where Jack is reunited with his family and all those who populate his memory. Jack meets his brothers and brings R.L. to his parents, who bids goodbye as he steps out of a home into a vast expanse. Accompanied by two girls in white, Mrs. O'Brien gracefully whispers, "I give him to you. I give you my son."

Jack's vision ends and he leaves the building, smiling and feeling tranquil. The film ends as the mysterious light continues to flicker in the darkness.

Cast

 Brad Pitt as Mr. O'Brien
 Jessica Chastain as Mrs. O'Brien
 Sean Penn as Jack O'Brien
 Hunter McCracken as young Jack
 Finnegan Williams as Jack (age 5)
 Michael Koeth as Jack (age 2)
 Laramie Eppler as R.L. O'Brien
 John Howell as R.L. (age 2) 
 Tye Sheridan as Steve O'Brien
 Kari Matchett as Jack's ex
 Joanna Going as Jack's wife
 Michael Showers as Mr. Brown
 Kimberly Whalen as Mrs. Brown
 Jackson Hurst as Uncle Roy
 Fiona Shaw as Grandmother
 Crystal Mantecón as Elisa
 Tamara Jolaine as Mrs. Stone
 Dustin Allen as George Walsh 
 Tommy Hollis as Tommy

Production

Development
In the late 1970s, Terrence Malick was offered $1 million for his project after Days of Heaven. Malick had an idea for a film that would be "a history of the cosmos up through the formation of the Earth and the beginnings of life." The film was known as Q and included elements not in The Tree of Life such as a section set in the Middle East during World War I, and an underwater minotaur dreaming about the evolution of the universe. One day, Malick "just stopped" working on the film.

Decades later, Malick pitched the concept of The Tree of Life to River Road Entertainment head Bill Pohlad while the two were collaborating on an early version of Che. Pohlad recalled initially thinking the idea was "crazy," but as the film concept evolved, he came to feel strongly about the idea; he ended up financing the film. Producer Grant Hill was also involved with the film at an early stage. During a meeting on a different subject involving Malick, his producer Sarah Green, Brad Pitt, and Pitt's Plan B Entertainment production partner Dede Gardner, Malick brought up Tree of Life and the difficulties it was having getting made. It was "much later on" that the decision was made for Pitt to be part of the cast.

The Tree of Life was announced in late 2005, with Indian production company Percept Picture Company set to finance it and Donald Rosenfeld on board as executive producer. The film was set to be shot partially in India, with pre-production scheduled to begin in January 2006. Colin Farrell and Mel Gibson were at one stage attached to the project. Heath Ledger was set to play the role of Mr. O'Brien, but dropped out (due to recurring sicknesses) a month before his death in early 2008.

For the roles of the three brothers, the production team spent over a year, seeing over 10,000 Texas students for the roles. About 95% of the entire cast had no prior acting experience.

In an October 2008 interview Jack Fisk, a longtime Malick collaborator, suggested that the director was attempting something radical. He also implied that details of the film were a close secret. In March 2009, visual effects artist Mike Fink revealed to Empire magazine that he was working on scenes of prehistoric Earth for the film. The similarity of the scenes Fink describes to descriptions of a hugely ambiguous project entitled Q that Malick worked on soon after Days of Heaven led to speculation that The Tree of Life is a resurrection of that abandoned project.

Filming
Principal photography began in Texas in 2008. Cinematographer Emmanuel Lubezki returned to work with Malick after collaborating with him on The New World. The film was shot in 1.85:1 and often used natural light. The film used 35mm, 65mm, and IMAX formats.

Locations included Smithville, Houston, Matagorda, Bastrop, Austin, Dallas, and Malick's hometown of Waco.

The eponym of the film is a large live oak tree that was excavated from a property five miles outside Smithville. The 65,000-pound tree and root ball were trucked into Smithville and replanted.

The sets for The Tree of Life were unusual for a large scale film. According to Brad Pitt, "A movie set is very chaotic. There [are] hundreds of people; there [are] generators and trucks. And this was a completely different experience — we had none of that." "There were no [camera] lights ... there were no generators and the camera was all hand-held so it was a very free-form, low-key experience."

Malick would change different aspects of a scene between takes in order to create "moments of truth".

Editing 
Similar to many of Malick's films, the film had "teams of editors to put together different cuts, and finding and discarding entire story lines during the post-production process." Malick used "unorthodox methods to edit the film". One of the film's editors, Billy Weber said “Terry is willing to try anything. Absolutely anything. Sometimes we’d cut a character out of a scene, or cut all the dialogue out of a scene, just to see if it worked. And when you’ve worked with him for any length of time, you can even try that without asking him about it first. He’s very open to looking at anything that you try.” This includes allowing film students from USC and University of Texas, as well as interns, to play a part in the editing process. Some of them stayed on the film the whole time.

In an unused ending for the film, Jack arrives as a boarding student at St. Stephen's Episcopal School, which Malick attended in the 1950s.

Visual effects
After nearly thirty years away from Hollywood, famed special effects supervisor Douglas Trumbull contributed to the visual effects work on The Tree of Life. Malick, a friend of Trumbull, approached him about the effects work and mentioned that he did not like the look of computer-generated imagery. Trumbull asked Malick, "Why not do it the old way? The way we did it in 2001?"

Working with visual effects supervisor Dan Glass, Trumbull used a variety of materials for the creation of the universe sequence. "We worked with chemicals, paint, fluorescent dyes, smoke, liquids, CO2, flares, spin dishes, fluid dynamics, lighting and high speed photography to see how effective they might be," said Trumbull. "It was a free-wheeling opportunity to explore, something that I have found extraordinarily hard to get in the movie business. Terry didn't have any preconceived ideas of what something should look like. We did things like pour milk through a funnel into a narrow trough and shoot it with a high-speed camera and folded lens, lighting it carefully and using a frame rate that would give the right kind of flow characteristics to look cosmic, galactic, huge and epic." The team also included Double Negative in London. Fluid-based effects were developed by Peter and Chris Parks, who had previously worked on similar effects for The Fountain.

A column in The New Yorker noted that the film credited Thomas Wilfred’s lumia composition Opus 161, and that this was the source of the "shifting flame of red-yellow light" at the beginning and the end.

Themes

Philosophical 
Many reviewers have noted the philosophical and theological themes of the film. Catholic author and now auxiliary bishop of Los Angeles Fr. Robert Barron, reviewing The Tree of Life for a Chicago Tribune blog, noted that "in the play of good and evil, in the tension between nature and grace, God is up to something beautiful, though we are unable to grasp it totally...“Tree of Life” is communicating this same difficult but vital lesson." The Catholic magazine America called the film "a philosophical exploration of grief, theodicy and the duality of grace and human nature". They described the final beach scene as "the greatest film depiction of eschatological bodily resurrection".

Rabbi David Wolpe says "that Terrence Malick's new film "Tree of Life" opens with a quotation from Job. That quotation holds the key to the film and in some sense, the key to our attitude toward life." He added that "The agony of the parents, the periodic cruelty of the father — all are the powerful but passing dramas that for the moment entirely preoccupy us as we watch the movie.  But then we are drawn back to a world so much bigger than our hour upon the stage that we know again how essentially small is each human story."

According to Bob Mondello, the film is showing that "to understand the death of a young man, we need to understand everything that led to his creation, starting with creation itself."

Kristen Scharold compared the film to Augustine's Confessions, and noted how one voiceover is nearly identical to a quote from Fyodor Dostoevsky's The Brothers Karamazov.

Nature and grace 
Many have said that Mr. O'Brien represents the way of nature, while Mrs. O'Brien represents the way of grace.

Brad Pitt said Mr. O'Brien "represents nature — but nature as that oppressive force that will choke another plant out for its own survival." "The American dream didn't work out as he believed it would. [He's] quite envious and bitter that people are ahead of him. Naturally, when someone feels oppressed, they find someone weaker to pass that oppression on[to], and the sadness in this situation [is] it's on his sons."

Autobiographical 
Many reviewers have noted the similarities between Jack's life and Terrence Malick's life. Jim Lynch, a close friend of Malick, told Malick that he thought The Tree of Life, Knight of Cups, and Song to Song, formed an "autobiographical trilogy". Lynch said Malick disliked the labeling and "didn’t want people thinking that he was just making movies about himself. He was making movies about broader issues.”

Release

In March 2009, Empire magazine's website quoted visual effects supervisor Mike Fink as saying that a version of the film will be released for IMAX cinemas along with two versions for traditional cinemas. The IMAX film has been revealed to be Voyage of Time, a documentary expanding on the "history of the universe" scenes in The Tree of Life, which the producers decided to focus on releasing at a later date so as not to cannibalize its release. It was released in IMAX in the United States on October 7, 2016 by Broad Green Pictures.

Delays and distribution problems
By May 2009, The Tree of Life had been sold to a number of international distributors, including EuropaCorp in France, TriPictures in Spain, and Icon in the United Kingdom and Australia, but lacked a US distributor. In August 2009, it was announced that the film would be released in the US through Apparition, a new distributor founded by River Road Entertainment head Bill Pohlad and former Picturehouse chief Bob Berney. A tentative date of December 25, 2009 was announced, but the film was not completed in time. Organisers of the Cannes Film Festival made negotiations to secure a premiere at Cannes 2010, resulting in Malick sending an early version of the film to Thierry Fremaux and the Cannes selection committee. Though Fremaux warmly received the cut and was eager to screen the film at his festival, Malick ultimately told him that he felt the film was not ready. On the eve of the 2010 Cannes Film Festival, Berney suddenly announced his departure from Apparition, leaving the company's future uncertain. Pohlad decided to keep The Tree of Life at Apparition, and after significant restructuring, hired Tom Ortenberg to act as a consultant on its release. A tentative plan was made to release it in late 2010, in time for awards consideration. Ultimately, Pohlad decided to close Apparition and sell rights to the film. Private screenings of the film to interested parties Fox Searchlight Pictures and Sony Pictures Classics took place at the 2010 Telluride Film Festival. On September 9, Fox Searchlight announced their acquisition of the film from Pohlad's River Road Entertainment. The film opened in limited release in the United States on May 27, 2011.

On March 28, 2011, UK magazine Empire reported that UK distributor Icon Entertainment was planning to release the film on May 4, 2011. This would make the UK the first region in the world to see the film, preempting the expected Cannes Film Festival premiere on May 11. This would disqualify the film from inclusion at Cannes. As a result, a surge of interest in the story developed on international film news sites. After film blogger Jeff Wells was told by a Fox Searchlight representative that this was "unlikely", and Anne Thompson received similar word from Searchlight and outright denial from Summit, Helen O'Hara from Empire received a confirmation from Icon that they intended to stick with the May 4 release. On March 31, Jeff Wells was told by Jill Jones, Summit's senior VP of international marketing and publicity, that Icon has lost the right to distribute The Tree of Life in the UK, due to defaulting on its agreement, with the matter pending arbitration at a tribunal in Los Angeles. On June 9, it was announced that The Tree of Life would be released in the UK on July 8, 2011, after Fox Searchlight Pictures picked up the UK rights from Icon.

Home media
The Tree of Life was released on Blu-ray Disc in the United States and Canada on October 11, 2011; on January 24, 2012, there was a separate release of the DVD.

During the Cannes Film Festival in 2011, Peter Becker, president of the home media company The Criterion Collection, and Fox Searchlight discussed a potential Criterion home video release that would include a longer alternate version of The Tree of Life which Malick would like to create. In an unprecedented move, Criterion decided to finance the alternate version for its eventual inclusion on both Blu-ray and DVD. In creating the alternate version, the original negatives' palettes were located for Malick to use, the entire film scanned in 4K resolution, cinematographer Emmanuel Lubezki brought in to help grade the footage, and a full sound mix created for the additional material, with Malick even dedicating "the better part of a year" to this project. Becker stated that the company has "never undertaken anything this extensive or this challenging, or anything that has taken this long to achieve or required so much effort on the part of pretty much every post-production craft. The only thing we didn’t do is go shoot new material".

Malick was careful to note that the extended cut of the film is an alternative version, not the definitive one. In an interview with Indiewire, Criterion technical director Lee Kline said:

Unlike with [The New World], [the version of The Tree of Life] that premiered in 2011 at Cannes [was] definitely the definitive version of the film he wanted to make. What’s interesting talking to Terry about this [new version of Tree of Life], I think he still doesn’t want people to think this is a better version. This is another version.
The extended version runs to 188 minutes; in addition to entirely new footage with new characters and scenes, it also extends existing scenes and features minor changes to the film's score, musical arrangements, and color grading. After premiering at the 75th Venice International Film Festival on September 7, 2018, the extended cut was released on September 11, along with a new 4K digital restoration of the original version. Both editions also include the film's trailer, the making-of documentary Exploring "The Tree of Life", a 2011 interview with composer Alexandre Desplat, new interviews with actress Jessica Chastain, visual-effects supervisor Dan Glass, and music critic Alex Ross, and a 2011 video essay by Matt Zoller Seitz, as well as a booklet containing essays by film critics Kent Jones and Roger Ebert. The cover used for both editions is designed by Neil Kellerhouse.

Soundtrack
The Tree of Life Original Motion Picture Soundtrack by Alexandre Desplat was released in 2011 by Lakeshore Records. "The Tree of Life" features selections and snippets from more than 30 individual pieces—including works by Brahms, Mahler, Bach, Couperin, Górecki and Holst. They are all woven together seamlessly with the help of some original music by Alexandre Desplat.

Reception

Critical response
Early reviews for The Tree of Life were polarized. After being met with both boos and applause at its premiere at the 2011 Cannes Film Festival, the film received mixed early reviews. It went on to be awarded the Palme d'Or. Two of its producers, Bill Pohlad and Sarah Green, accepted the prize on behalf of the reclusive Malick. The Tree of Life is the first American film to win the Palme d'Or since Fahrenheit 9/11 in 2004. The head of the jury, Robert De Niro, said it was difficult to choose a winner, but The Tree of Life "ultimately fit the bill". De Niro explained, "It had the size, the importance, the intention, whatever you want to call it, that seemed to fit the prize."

The Tree of Life has since garnered critical acclaim. On Rotten Tomatoes, 84% of critics have given the film a positive review based on 294 reviews, with an average rating of 8.2/10. The site's critics consensus reads "Terrence Malick's singularly deliberate style may prove unrewarding for some, but for patient viewers, Tree of Life is an emotional as well as visual treat." On Metacritic, which assigns a weighted mean rating out of 100 reviews from film critics, the film has a rating score of 85 based on 50 reviews, indicating "universal acclaim".

Roger Ebert gave the film four stars of four and wrote:  The following year, Ebert gave The Tree of Life one of his 10 votes in Sight & Sounds 2012 critics' poll of the world's greatest films. Anthony Lane of The New Yorker said a "seraphic strain" in Malick's work "hits a solipsistic high" in The Tree of Life. "While the result will sound to some like a prayer, others may find it increasingly lonely and locked, and may themselves pray for Ben Hecht or Billy Wilder to rise from the dead and attack Malick’s script with a quiver of poisonous wisecracks."

Peter Bradshaw of The Guardian awarded it five stars and lauded it as an "unashamedly epic reflection on love and loss" and a "mad and magnificent film." Todd McCarthy of The Hollywood Reporter states "Brandishing an ambition it's likely no film, including this one, could entirely fulfill, The Tree of Life is nonetheless a singular work, an impressionistic metaphysical inquiry into mankind's place in the grand scheme of things that releases waves of insights amidst its narrative imprecisions." Justin Chang of Variety states the film "represents something extraordinary" and "is in many ways his simplest yet most challenging work, a transfixing odyssey through time and memory that melds a young boy's 1950s upbringing with a magisterial rumination on the Earth's origins." Peter Travers of Rolling Stone states "Shot with a poet's eye, Malick's film is a groundbreaker, a personal vision that dares to reach for the stars." A. O. Scott of The New York Times gave the film much praise and stated, "The sheer beauty of this film is almost overwhelming, but as with other works of religiously minded art, its aesthetic glories are tethered to a humble and exalted purpose, which is to shine the light of the sacred on secular reality". Total Film gave the film a five-star review (denoting 'outstanding'): "The Tree of Life is beautiful. Ridiculously, rapturously beautiful. You could press 'pause' at any second and hang the frame on your wall." Richard Corliss of Time named it one of the Top 10 Best Movies of 2011.

Some religious reviewers welcomed the spiritual themes of the film. For instance, Catholic author and now auxiliary bishop of Los Angeles Fr. Robert Barron, reviewing The Tree of Life for a Chicago Tribune blog, noted that "in the play of good and evil, in the tension between nature and grace, God is up to something beautiful, though we are unable to grasp it totally...“Tree of Life” is communicating this same difficult but vital lesson." Rabbi David Wolpe says "that Terrence Malick's new film "Tree of Life" opens with a quotation from Job. That quotation holds the key to the film and in some sense, the key to our attitude toward life."

Not all reviews were positive. Sukhdev Sandhu, chief film critic of The Daily Telegraph describes the movie as "self-absorbed," and "achingly slow, almost buckling under the weight of its swoony poetry." Likewise, Stephanie Zacharek of Movieline praised the technical aspects of the film, such as the "gorgeous photography", but nonetheless criticized it as "a gargantuan work of pretension and cleverly concealed self-absorption." Lee Marshall of Screen Daily referred to the film as "a cinematic credo about spiritual transcendence which, while often shot through with poetic yearning, preaches too directly to its audience." Filmmaker David Lynch said that, while he liked Malick's previous works, The Tree of Life "was not his cup of tea". In 2016, John Patterson of The Guardian complained of the meager impression that the film left on him, opining that "much of it simply evaporates before your eyes."

Sean Penn has said, "The screenplay is the most magnificent one that I've ever read but I couldn't find that same emotion on screen. ... A clearer and more conventional narrative would have helped the film without, in my opinion, lessening its beauty and its impact." He further clarified his reservations about the film by adding, "But it's a film I recommend, as long as you go in without any preconceived ideas. It's up to each person to find their own personal, emotional or spiritual connection to it. Those that do generally emerge very moved."

Top ten lists
The film appeared on over 70 critics' year-end top ten lists, including 15 first-place rankings. The Tree of Life was voted best film of 2011 in the annual Sight & Sound critic poll, earning one and a half times as many votes as runner up A Separation. The film also topped the critics poll of best released film of 2011 by Film Comment, and the IndieWire annual critics survey for 2011, as well as The Village Voice/LA Weekly Film Poll 2011. In France, Cahiers du cinéma placed it second on its 2011 top ten list, tying it with The Strange Case of Angelica. Keith Uhlich of Time Out New York named The Tree of Life the third-best film of 2011, writing that "it may be the best thing [Malick's] ever done."

In 2012, 16 critics, including Roger Ebert, included it as one of their 10 votes for Sight & Sound; this placed it at #102 in the final list (making it the fourth film on the list which had been released since the year 2000, behind Wong Kar-wai's In the Mood for Love, Edward Yang's Yi Yi, and David Lynch's Mulholland Drive). The film also received five votes in the directors' poll (placing it at #132).

In 2015, Bradshaw named the film one of the top 50 films of the decade so far by The Guardian. The Tree of Life ranked 79th on the British Broadcasting Corporation (BBC)'s 100 Greatest American Films in 2015, as well as seventh in the 100 Greatest Films of the 21st Century in August 2016. The latter list was compiled by polling 177 film critics from around the world.

In 2019, The Guardian ranked The Tree of Life 28th in its 100 best films of the 21st century list. In December 2019, The Tree of Life topped The Associated Press' list of the best films of the 2010s. In March 2020, America magazine put the film on its The Top 25 Films from the Last 25 Years.

Accolades

The film won the Palme d'Or at the 2011 Cannes Film Festival. The film was nominated for Academy Award for Best Picture, Academy Award for Best Director, and Academy Award for Best Cinematography at the 84th Academy Awards

The film won the 2011 FIPRESCI (International Federation of Film Critics) Big Prize for the Best Film Of the Year. The award was presented on September 16, during the opening ceremony of the 59th San Sebastián International Film Festival. Malick released a statement of thanks for the award. On November 28, it was announced that the film had won the Gotham Award for Best Feature, shared with Beginners.

References

External links

 Two Ways Through Life: The Tree of Life (2011) Film Enthusiast
 
 
 The Tree of Life: Let the Wind Speak an essay by Kent Jones at the Criterion Collection

2011 films
2011 fantasy films
2010s science fiction films
American coming-of-age films
American drama films
Films about evolution
Fox Searchlight Pictures films
Films about religion
Films directed by Terrence Malick
Films produced by Brad Pitt
Films scored by Alexandre Desplat
Films set in Texas
Films set in the 1950s
Films shot in Houston
Films shot in Texas
Metaphysical fiction films
American nonlinear narrative films
Magic realism films
Palme d'Or winners
Plan B Entertainment films
Works about meaning of life
Films produced by Grant Hill (producer)
Films about father–son relationships
2010s English-language films
2010s American films